The Almada River is a river of Bahia state in eastern Brazil.

Basin

The Almada River basin is in the southern region of Bahia State, covering the municipalities of Almadina, Coaraci, Ibicaraí, Barro Preto, Itajuípe, Itabuna, Ilhéus and Uruçuca. 
It is in the cocoa-growing region of Bahia.
It includes significant fragments of Atlantic Forest, as well as secondary forest and mangroves.
The climate of the basin is hot and humid.
According to the Köppen climate classification, there are three climate domains.
In the west it is Aw - tropical climate with winter dry season, in the center in is Am - monsoon climate and on the coast it is Af - humid tropical climate.

Course

Its mouth is near the Trincheiras Cove, where the port of Malhado is located.
The lower section of the river runs through the  Lagoa Encantada e Rio Almada Environmental Protection Area (APA), created in 1993, where it drains the Lagoa Encantada.
In the APA it passes the communities of Castelo Novo, Sambaituba and Aritaguá.
From Aritaguá the river flows south parallel to the sea shore past Iguape, and empties into the Atlantic Ocean near the town of Ilhéus.

The Almada River supplies water to the towns of Itajuípe and Coaraci.
It supplies about 70% of the water used by residents of Itabuna.
In the summer of 2015–16 water rationing was imposed due to low levels in the river, which had dried up in some sections.
As of 2010 half the domestic sewage from Aritaguá  was released directly into the river, while 25% went into pits in backyards, and indirectly contaminated the river. 
Garbage was also dumped in the river.

See also
List of rivers of Bahia

References

Sources

Rivers of Bahia